Danger in the Dark is an American mystery novel by Mignon G. Eberhart. It was published by Doubleday Doran in 1937. Collins Crime Club released the book in the US with the new title Hand in Glove. A mass market paperback edition was released by MacFaden in December, 1966.

References

External links 
Danger in the Dark at Kirkus Reviews
Danger in the Dark at Goodreads
Danger in the Dark at Fantastic Fiction

1941 American novels
American mystery novels
Novels set in Chicago
Doubleday, Doran books
Novels by Mignon G. Eberhart